The concept of vehicle-specific power (VSP) is a formalism used in the evaluation of vehicle emissions. The idea was first developed by J. L. Jiménez  at the Massachusetts Institute of Technology. Informally, it is the sum of the loads resulting from aerodynamic drag, acceleration, rolling resistance, and hill climbing, all divided by the mass of the vehicle. Conventionally, it is reported in kilowatts per tonne, the instantaneous power demand of the vehicle divided by its mass. VSP, combined with dynamometer and remote-sensing measurements, can be used to determine vehicle emissions.

The United States Environmental Protection Agency held a "modelling shootout" in 2001, to help with the development of its (then) new MOVES (motor vehicle emissions simulator) vehicle emissions model. Two of the four modelling metholodogies in the shootout, one from North Carolina State University  and one internal to the EPA, used vehicle-specific power metrics. MOVES was eventually implemented using vehicle-specific power as its primary metric. (See  for the EPA MOVES draft VSP specification.)

Formulae
Jiménez's own formula is:
 

VSP can be simplified using typical coefficient values. Haibo Zhai of North Carolina State University provides the following formula for transit buses:

where:
vvehicle speed (in metres per second)
avehicle acceleration (in metres per second per second)
gacceleration due to gravity (gee, in metres per second per second)
ϕroad grade
ψrolling resistance coefficient (metres per second per second)
ζdrag coefficient (reciprocal metres)

References

Cross-reference

Sources used

Further reading
 
 
 
 
 

Vehicle technology